WXIS (103.9 FM) is a 24-hour all-news radio station serving Elizabethton, Greeneville, and the Tri-Cities region of Johnson City, Kingsport and Bristol in Tennessee, as well as Bristol in Virginia. The WEMB outlet operates with an ERP of 6 kW and is licensed and based in Erwin, Tennessee.

External links

XIS
Radio stations established in 1968
All-news radio stations in the United States